Paul Thorp (born 9 September 1964 in Macclesfield, Cheshire, England) is a motorcycle speedway rider won the World Team Cup with England in 1989.

World final appearances

Individual World Championship
 1991 –  Göteborg, Ullevi – 6th – 10pts

World Team Cup
 1989 –  Bradford, Odsal Stadium (with Jeremy Doncaster / Kelvin Tatum / Simon Wigg / Simon Cross) – Winner – 48pts (12)

References

1964 births
Living people
British speedway riders
English motorcycle racers
Belle Vue Aces riders
Workington Comets riders
Birmingham Brummies riders
Berwick Bandits riders
Wolverhampton Wolves riders
Stoke Potters riders
Newcastle Diamonds riders
Hull Vikings riders
Bradford Dukes riders
Scunthorpe Scorpions riders
Sportspeople from Macclesfield